Brian Fox (born 19 July 1988) is an Irish Gaelic football  who plays his club football for Éire Óg and previously at inter-county level for Tipperary. Fox is the nephew of former Tipperary hurler Pat Fox.

Career
He made his championship debut in 2009 against Limerick. 
On 31 July 2016, Fox started in the half forward line as Tipperary defeated Galway in the 2016 All-Ireland Quarter-finals at Croke Park to reach their first All-Ireland semi-final since 1935.
On 21 August 2016, Tipperary were beaten in the semi-final by Mayo on a 2-13 to 0-14 scoreline.

On 8 April 2017, Tipperary captained by Fox won the Division 3 final of the 2017 National Football League after a 3-19 to 0-19 win against Louth in Croke Park.

On 22 November 2020, Tipperary won the 2020 Munster Senior Football Championship after a 0-17 to 0-14 win against Cork in the final. It was Tipperary's first Munster title in 85 years.

In November 2021, Fox announced his retirement from inter-county football after 14 seasons.

Honours
Tipperary
National Football League Promotion Division 4: 2008
National Football League Division 3 Winners: 2009
National Football League Division 4 Winners: 2014
National Football League Division 3 (1): 2017 (c)
Munster Senior Football Championship (1): 2020

References

External links
Tipperary GAA Profile

1988 births
Living people
Tipperary inter-county Gaelic footballers
Place of birth missing (living people)